Espin or Espín is a surname. Notable people with the surname include:

 Alejandro Castro Espín (born 1965), Cuban political and military figure
 Juan Valera Espín (born 1984), Spanish footballer 
 T. H. E. C. Espin (1858–1934), British astronomer 
 Vilma Espín (1930–2007), Cuban revolutionary